Bušinja Vas is a settlement in the Municipality of Metlika in the White Carniola area of southeastern Slovenia. The area is part of the traditional region of Lower Carniola and is now included in the Southeast Slovenia Statistical Region.

The local church, built on the eastern edge of the village, is dedicated to Saint Mark and belongs to the Parish of Suhor. It is a Baroque building, first mentioned in written documents dating to 1689.

References

External links
Bušinja Vas on Geopedia

Populated places in the Municipality of Metlika